Poe: More Tales of Mystery and Imagination is an album by Eric Woolfson. It contains some, but not all, of the songs from his musical Edgar Allan Poe.

Track listing

Personnel
 Eric Woolfson – keyboards, orchestration, lead & backing vocals
 Simon Chamberlain – keyboards, orchestration
 Haydn Bendall – keyboards & sequencing
 Austin Ince – sequencing
 John Parricelli – guitar
 Laurence Cottle – bass guitar
 Dermot Crehan – Irish fiddle
 Steve Balsamo – lead and backing vocals
 Fred Johanson – lead vocals on Train To Freedom, backing vocals
 Christian Phillips, Rob Thompson, Stefan Rhys Williams – backing vocals
 Brighton Festival Chorus & The Metro Voices – Chorus on The Bells and Goodbye to All That.
 Ian Thomas – drums
 Ralph Salmins – drums, percussion
 Martin Ditcham – percussion

CD release and Stage Musical Version

The music of Poe was first released on the studio recorded CD Poe: More Tales of Mystery and Imagination, containing 10 tracks (including the 3 parts of The Pit and the Pendulum as a single track).  The CD running order did not match that of the later stage show.

The stage musical version of Woolfson's Poe premiered at Abbey Road Studios in November 2003.

The musical contains seventeen songs.  The seven songs which are missing from the 2003 Poe: More Tales from Mystery and Imagination CD are:
Blinded By the Light
The Raven
It Doesn't Take a Genius
The Devil I Know
Trust Me
Annabel Lee/Let the Sun Shine on Me
What Fools People Are

The full complement of the musical's 18 songs is found on an expanded 2009 CD release, which is titled (like the stage musical itself) Edgar Allan Poe. This release includes the original 10 studio tracks, an orchestrated version of Tiny Star, and seven tracks taken from live concert performances.  The running order of the Edgar Allan Poe CD is:
01. Angel of the Odd
02. Tiny Star
03. Wings of Eagles
04. The Murders in the Rue Morgue
05. Blinded by the Light
06. The Pit and the Pendulum
07. The Raven This track uses music from the original Alan Parsons Project track of the same title from their album Tales of Mystery and Imagination. It features the bass line and keyboard chords from the opening of the Alan Parson Project song.  It also features a spoken reading of Poe's poem, without the use of vocoder found on the Alan Parsons project song.
08. It Doesn't Take a Genius
09. The Bells
10. Goodbye to All That
11. The Devil I Know
12. Somewhere in the Audience
13. Trust Me
14. Annabel Lee/Let the Sun Shine on me
15. Train to Freedom
16. What Fools People Are
17. Immortal

The 2009 CD release Edgar Allan Poe effectively supersedes the 2003 Poe: More Tales of Mystery and Imagination, since it contains all of the earlier tracks plus additional ones.

References

External links
 Poe Website: The Official Poe Website
 Eric Woolfson Website: The Official Eric Woolfson Website
 The Alan Parsons Project Website: The Official Alan Parsons Project Website
 Fred Johanson : http://fredjohanson.com/
 

2003 albums
Eric Woolfson albums
Concept albums
Music based on works by Edgar Allan Poe